There are a large number of QWERTY keyboard layouts used for different languages written in the Latin script. Many of these keyboards include some additional symbols of other languages, but there also exist layouts that were designed with the goal to be usable for multiple languages (see Multilingual variants). This list gives general descriptions of QWERTY keyboard variants along with details specific to certain operating systems, with emphasis on Microsoft Windows.

Specific language variants

English

Canada
English-speaking Canadians have traditionally used the same keyboard layout as in the United States, unless they are in a position where they have to write French on a regular basis. French-speaking Canadians respectively have favoured the Canadian French (CFR) and the Canadian French ACNOR (CFA) keyboard layouts (see below).

United Kingdom

The United Kingdom and Ireland use a keyboard layout based on the 48-key version defined in the (now withdrawn) British Standard BS 4822. It is very similar to that of the United States, but has an AltGr key and a larger Enter key, includes £ and € signs and some rarely used EBCDIC symbols (¬, ¦), and uses different positions for the characters @, ", #, ~, \, and |.

The BS 4822:1994 standard did not make any use of the AltGr key and lacked support for any non-ASCII characters other than ¬ and £. It also assigned a key for the non-ASCII character broken bar (¦), but lacks one for the far more commonly used ASCII character vertical bar (|). It also lacked support for various diacritics used in the Welsh alphabet, and the Scottish Gaelic alphabet; and also is missing the letter yogh, ȝ, used very rarely in the Scots language. Therefore, various manufacturers have modified or extended the BS 4822 standard:
 The B00 key (left of Z), shifted, results in vertical bar (|) on some systems (e.g. Windows UK/Ireland keyboard layout and Linux/X11 UK/Ireland keyboard layout), rather than the broken bar (¦) assigned by BS 4822 and provided in some systems (e.g. IBM OS/2 UK166 keyboard layout)
 The E00 key (left of 1) with AltGr provides either vertical bar (|) (OS/2's UK166 keyboard layout, Linux/X11 UK keyboard layout) or broken bar (¦) (Windows UK/Ireland keyboard layout)

Support for the diacritics needed for Scots Gaelic and Welsh was added to Windows and ChromeOS using a "UK-extended" setting (see below); Linux and X-Windows systems have an explicit or redesignated compose key for this purpose.

UK Apple keyboard

The British version of the Apple Keyboard does not use the standard UK layout. Umlauts are reached by typing  and then the vowel, and ß is reached by typing .

Newer Apple "British" keyboards use a layout that is relatively unlike either the US or traditional UK keyboard.

United States

The arrangement of the character input keys and the Shift keys contained in this layout is specified in the US national standard ANSI-INCITS 154-1988 (R1999) (formerly ANSI X3.154-1988 (R1999)), where this layout is called "ASCII keyboard". The complete US keyboard layout, as it is usually found, also contains the usual function keys in accordance with the international standard ISO/IEC 9995-2, although this is not explicitly required by the US American national standard.

US keyboards are used not only in the United States, but also in many other English-speaking places, (except UK and Ireland), including India, Australia, Anglophone Canada, Hong Kong, New Zealand, South Africa, Malaysia, Singapore, Philippines, and Indonesia that uses the same 26-letter alphabets as English. In many other English-speaking jurisdictions (e.g., Canada, Australia, the Caribbean nations, Hong Kong, Malaysia, India, Pakistan, Bangladesh, Singapore, New Zealand, and South Africa), local spelling sometimes conforms more closely to British English usage, although these nations decided to use a US English keyboard layout. Until Windows 8 and later versions, when Microsoft separated the settings, this had the undesirable side effect of also setting the language to US English, rather than the local orthography.

The US keyboard layout has a second Alt key instead of the AltGr key and does not use any dead keys; this makes it inefficient for all but a handful of languages. On the other hand, the US keyboard layout (or the similar UK layout) is occasionally used by programmers in countries where the keys for []{} are located in less convenient positions on the locally customary layout.

On some keyboards the enter key is bigger than traditionally and takes up also a part of the line above, more or less the area of the traditional location of the backslash key (\). In these cases the backslash is located in alternative places. It can be situated one line above the default location, on the right of the equals sign key (=). Sometimes it is placed one line below its traditional situation, on the right of the apostrophe key (') (in these cases the enter key is narrower than usual on the line of its default location). It may also be two lines below its default situation on the right of a narrower than traditionally right shift key. A variant of this layout is used in Arabic-speaking countries.
This variant has the | \ key to the left of Z, ~ ` key where the | \ key is in the usual layout, and the > < key where the ~ ` key is in the usual layout.

Czech

The typewriter came to the Czech-speaking area in the late 19th century, when it was part of Austria-Hungary where German was the dominant language of administration. Therefore, Czech typewriters have the QWERTZ layout.

However, with the introduction of imported computers, especially since the 1990s, the QWERTY keyboard layout is frequently used for computer keyboards. The Czech QWERTY layout differs from QWERTZ in that the characters (e.g. @$& and others) missing from the Czech keyboard are accessible with AltGr on the same keys where they are located on an American keyboard. In Czech QWERTZ keyboards the positions of these characters accessed through AltGr differs.

Danish

Computers with Windows are commonly sold with ÖØÆ and ÄÆØ  printed on the two keys, allowing same computer hardware to be sold in Denmark, Finland, Norway and Sweden, with different operating system settings.

Dutch (Netherlands)

Though it is seldom used (most Dutch keyboards use US International layout), the Dutch layout uses QWERTY but has additions for the € sign, the diaresis (¨), and the braces ({ }) as well as different locations for other symbols. In the 1990s, there was a version with the now-obsolete florin sign (Dutch: guldenteken) for IBM PCs.

In Flanders (the Dutch-speaking part of Belgium), "AZERTY" keyboards are used instead, due to influence from the French-speaking part of Belgium.

See also #US-International in the Netherlands below.

Estonian

The keyboard layout used in Estonia is virtually the same as the Swedish layout. Some special symbols and dead keys are also moved around.

Faroese

The same as the Danish layout with added  (Eth), since the Faroe Islands are a self-governed part of the Kingdom of Denmark.

French (Canada)

The Canadian French (CFR) keyboard layout is commonly used in Canada by French-speaking Canadians. It is the most common layout for laptops and stand-alone keyboards aimed at the Francophone market. Unlike the AZERTY layout used in France and Belgium, it is a QWERTY layout and as such is also relatively commonly used by English speakers in the US and Canada (accustomed to using US standard QWERTY keyboards) for easy access to the accented letters found in some French loanwords. It can be used to type all accented French characters, as well as some from other languages, and serves all English functions as well. It is popular mainly because of its close similarity to the basic US keyboard commonly used by English-speaking Canadians and Americans, historical use of US-made typewriters by French-Canadians. The right Alt key is reconfigured as an AltGr key that gives easy access to a further range of characters (marked in blue and red on the keyboard image. Blue indicates an alternative character that will display as typed. Red indicates a dead key: the diacritic will be applied to the next vowel typed.) The traditional Canadian French keyboard from IBM must use an ISO keyboard. The French guillemets located on the extra key are needed to type proper French, they are not optional. A dvorak version (traditional Canadian french layout) is also supported by Microsoft® Windows®.

In this keyboard, the key names are translated to French:

The "hybrid" keyboard layout, often referred incorrectly as "canadian multilingual" or "bilingual" is a mix between the US English and the Canadian French layout over an ISO keyboard. This layout has been developed by manufacturers as a cost saving strategy first for their low end laptops. They tend to be extended to the mid-range laptops in the recent years and sold wrongly as a "French" keyboard. Today, this layout seems to be criticized by both anglophones and francophones. The anglophones accustomed to the ANSI keyboard complain about the small ISO shift on left and francophones can find these legends hard to read and messy. In this keyboard, the key names are translated in both French and English. This keyboard can be netherless useful for programming.

This layout is known as Canadian French (Legacy) today on Windows and is considered to be the ancestor to the actual Canadian Multilingual Standard. The CMS on Windows® and Linux is based on the CAN/CSA Z243.200-92 standard (launched in 1992 by the CSA Group, revised in 2021). Apple® use a layout based mostly on the standardized CSA keyboard from 1992 too, called Canadian French ― CSA. The CMS is one of the few layouts allowing to type the ligature œ/Œ, common in French. The integral version use pictograms based on the ISO 9995-7 standard. Unlike the traditional Canadian French keyboard developed by IBM, the CSA Keyboard is also standardized on both ISO and ANSI keyboard. The Ù on the extra key can be replaced by a combinaison of + (dead key left from ) then  or +. The ISO version still netherless needed by the Quebec government, following their higher standard named SGQRI-001. The Quebec CSA keyboard is also named Canadian French ACNOR (CFA) or Canadian International Bilingual.

Greek

 The stress accents, indicated in red, are produced by pressing that key (or shifted key) followed by an appropriate vowel.
 Use of the "AltGr" key may produce the characters shown in blue.

German

Germany, Austria, Switzerland, Liechtenstein, and Luxembourg use QWERTZ layouts, where the letter Z is to the right of T.

Icelandic

The Icelandic keyboard layout is different from the standard QWERTY keyboard because the Icelandic alphabet has some special letters, most of which it shares with the other Nordic countries:
Þ/þ, Ð/ð, Æ/æ, and Ö/ö. (Æ/æ also occurs in Norwegian, Danish and Faroese, Ð/ð in Faroese, and Ö/ö in Swedish, Finnish and Estonian. In Norwegian Ö/ö could be substituted for Ø/Ø which is the same sound/letter and is widely understood).

The letters Á/á, Ý/ý, Ú/ú, Í/í, Ó/ó and É/é are produced by first pressing the  dead key and then the corresponding letter. These letters are not used natively in Icelandic, but may have been implemented for ease of communication in other Nordic languages.

Irish

The other Insular Celtic languages have their own layout. The UK or UK-Extended layout is also frequently used.

Italian

 Braces (right above square brackets and shown in purple) are given with both AltGr and Shift pressed.
 The tilde (~) and backquote (`) characters are not present on the Italian keyboard layout (with Linux, they are available by pressing ++, and ++; Windows might not recognise these keybindings).
 When using Microsoft Windows, the standard Italian keyboard layout does not allow one to write 100% correct Italian language, since it lacks capital accented vowels, and in particular the È key. The common workaround is writing E' (E followed by an apostrophe) instead, or relying on the auto-correction feature of several word processors when available. It is possible to obtain the È symbol in MS Windows by typing  + . Mac users, however, can write the correct accented character by pressing  +  +  or, in the usual Mac way, by pressing the correct key for the accent (in this case  + ) and subsequently pressing the wanted letter (in this case  + ). Linux users can also write it by pressing the  key with  enabled.

There is an alternate layout, which differs only in disposition of characters accessible through , and includes the tilde and the curly brackets. It is commonly used in IBM keyboards.

Italian typewriters often have the QZERTY layout instead.

The Italian-speaking part of Switzerland uses the QWERTZ keyboard.

Latvian
Although rarely used, a keyboard layout specifically designed for the Latvian language called ŪGJRMV exists. The Latvian QWERTY keyboard layout is most commonly used; its layout is the same as the United States one, but with a dead key, which allows entering special characters (āčēģīķļņōŗšūž). The most common dead key is the apostrophe ('), which is followed by Alt+Gr (Windows default for Latvian layout). Some prefer using the tick (`).

Lithuanian
Where in standard QWERTY the number row is located, you find in Lithuanian QWERTY: Ą, Č, Ę, Ė, Į, Š, Ų, Ū, Ž, instead of their counterparts 1, 2, 3, 4, 5, 6, 7, 8, =. If you still want to use the numbers of the mentioned 'number row', you can create them in combination with the -key. Aside from these changes the keyboard is standard QWERTY. Besides QWERTY, the ĄŽERTY layout without the adjustment of the number row is used.

Maltese
The Maltese language uses Unicode (UTF-8) to display the Maltese diacritics: ċ Ċ; ġ Ġ; ħ Ħ; ż Ż (together with à À; è È; ì Ì; ò Ò; ù Ù). There are two standard keyboard layouts for Maltese, according to "MSA 100:2002 Maltese Keyboard Standard"; one of 47 keys and one of 48 keys. The 48-key layout is the most popular.

Norwegian

There is also an alternative keyboard layout called Norwegian with Sámi, which allows for easier input of the characters required to write various Sámi languages. All the Sámi characters are accessed through the  key.

Polish

Most typewriters use a QWERTZ keyboard with Polish letters (with diacritical marks) accessed directly (officially approved as "Typist's keyboard", Polish Standard PN-87), which is mainly ignored in Poland as impractical (custom-made keyboards, e.g., those in the public sector as well as some Apple computers, present an exception to this paradigm); the "Polish programmer's" layout has become the de facto standard, used on virtually all computers sold on the Polish market.

Most computer keyboards in Poland are laid out according to the standard US visual and functional layout. Polish diacritics are accessed by using the AltGr key with a corresponding similar letter from the base Latin alphabet. Normal capitalization rules apply with respect to Shift and Caps Lock keys. For example, to enter "Ź", one can type Shift+AltGr+X with Caps Lock off, or turn on Caps Lock and type AltGr+X.

Both ANSI and ISO mechanical layouts are common sights, and even some non-standard mechanical layouts are in use. ANSI is often preferred, as the additional key provides no additional function, at least in Microsoft Windows where it duplicates the backslash key, while taking space from the Shift key. Many keyboards do not label AltGr as such, leaving the Alt marking as in the US layout - the right Alt key nevertheless functions as AltGr in this layout, causing possible confusion when keyboard shortcuts with the Alt key are required (these usually work only with the left Alt) and causing the key to be commonly referred to as right Alt. However, keyboards with AltGr marking are available and it is also officially used by Microsoft when depicting the layout.

Also, on MS Windows, the tilde character "~" (Shift+`) acts as a dead key to type Polish letters (with diacritical marks) thus, to obtain an "Ł", one may press Shift+` followed by L. The tilde character is obtained with (Shift+`) then space.

In Linux-based systems, the euro symbol is typically mapped to Alt+5 instead of Alt+U, the tilde acts as a normal key, and several accented letters from other European languages are accessible through combinations with left Alt. Polish letters are also accessible by using the compose key.

Software keyboards on touchscreen devices usually make the Polish diacritics available as one of the alternatives which show up after long-pressing the corresponding Latin letter. However, modern predictive text and autocorrection algorithms largely mitigate the need to type them directly on such devices.

Portuguese

Brazil

The Brazilian computer keyboard layout is specified in the ABNT NBR 10346 variant 2 (alphanumeric portion) and 10347 (numeric portion) standards.

Essentially, the Brazilian keyboard contains dead keys for five variants of diacritics in use in the language; the letter Ç, the only application of the cedilla in Portuguese, has its own key. In some keyboard layouts the + combination produces the ₢ character (Unicode 0x20A2), symbol for the old currency cruzeiro, a symbol that is not used in practice (the common abbreviation in the eighties and nineties used to be Cr$). The cent sign ¢, is accessible via +, but is not commonly used for the centavo, subunit of previous currencies as well as the current real, which itself is represented by R$. The Euro sign € is not standardized in this layout. The masculine and feminine ordinals ª and º are accessible via  combinations. The section sign § (Unicode U+00A7), in Portuguese called parágrafo, is nowadays practically only used to denote sections of laws.

Variant 2 of the Brazilian keyboard, the only which gained general acceptance (MS Windows treats both variants as the same layout), has a unique mechanical layout, combining some features of the ISO 9995-3 and the JIS keyboards in order to fit 12 keys between the left and right Shift (compared to the American standard of 10 and the international of 11). Its modern, IBM PS/2-based variations, are thus known as 107-keys keyboards, and the original PS/2 variation was 104-key. Variant 1, never widely adopted, was based on the ISO 9995-2 keyboards. To make this layout usable with keyboards with only 11 keys in the last row, the rightmost key (/?°) has its functions replicated across the +, +, and + combinations.

Portugal

Essentially, the Portuguese keyboard contains dead keys for five variants of diacritics; the letter Ç, the only application of the cedilla in Portuguese, has its own key, but there are also a dedicated key for the ordinal indicators and a dedicated key for quotation marks. The + combination for producing the euro sign € (Unicode 0x20AC) has become standard. On some QWERTY keyboards the key labels are translated, but the majority are labelled in English.

During the 20th century, a different keyboard layout, HCESAR, was in widespread use in Portugal.

Romanian

The current Romanian National Standard SR 13392:2004 establishes two layouts for Romanian keyboards: a "primary" one and a "secondary" one.

The "primary" layout is intended for traditional users who have learned how to type with older, Microsoft-style implementations of the Romanian keyboard. The "secondary" layout is mainly used by programmers as it does not contradict the physical arrangement of keys on a US-style keyboard. The "secondary" arrangement is used as the default Romanian layout by Linux distributions, as defined in the "X Keyboard Configuration Database".

There are four Romanian-specific characters that are incorrectly implemented in versions of Microsoft Windows until Vista came out:
 Ș (U+0218, S with comma), incorrectly implemented as Ş (U+015E, S with cedilla)
 ș (U+0219, s with comma), incorrectly implemented as ş (U+015F, s with cedilla)
 Ț (U+021A, T with comma), incorrectly implemented as Ţ (U+0162, T with cedilla)
 ț (U+021B, t with comma), incorrectly implemented as ţ (U+0163, t with cedilla)

The cedilla-versions of the characters do not exist in the Romanian language (they came to be used due to a historic bug). The UCS now says that encoding this was a mistake because it messed up Romanian data and the letters with cedilla and the letters with comma are the same letter with a different style.

Since Romanian hardware keyboards are not widely available, Cristian Secară has created a driver that allows Romanian characters to be generated with a US-style keyboard in all versions of Windows prior to Vista through the use of the AltGr key modifier.

Windows Vista and newer versions include the correct diacritical signs in the default Romanian Keyboard layout.

This layout has the Z and Y keys mapped like in English layouts and also includes characters like the 'at' (@) and dollar ($) signs, among others. The older cedilla-version layout is still included albeit as the 'Legacy' layout.

Slovak

In Slovakia, similarly to the Czech Republic, both QWERTZ and QWERTY keyboard layouts are used. QWERTZ is the default keyboard layout for Slovak in Microsoft Windows.

Spanish

Spain

The Spanish keyboard layout is used to write in Spanish and in other languages of Spain such as Catalan, Basque, Galician, Aragonese, Asturian and Occitan. It includes Ñ for Spanish, Asturian and Galician, the acute accent, the diaeresis, the inverted question and exclamation marks (¿, ¡), the superscripted o and a (º, ª) for writing abbreviated ordinal numbers in masculine and feminine in Spanish and Galician, and finally, some characters required only for typing Catalan and Occitan, namely Ç, the grave accent and the interpunct ( / , used in l·l, n·h, s·h; located at Shift-3). It can also be used to write other international characters, such as those using a circumflex accent (used in French and Portuguese among others) or a tilde (used in both Spanish and Portuguese), which are available as dead keys. However, it lacks two characters used in Asturian: Ḥ and Ḷ (historically, general support for these two has been poor – they are not present in the ISO 8859-1 character encoding standard, or any other ISO/IEC 8859 standard). Several alternative distributions, based on this one or created from scratch, have been created to address this issue (see the Other original layouts and layout design software section for more information).

On most keyboards, € is marked as Alt Gr + E and not Alt Gr + 5 as shown in the image. However, in some keyboards, € is found marked twice. An alternative version exists, supporting all of ISO 8859-1.

Spanish keyboards are usually labelled in Spanish instead of English, its abbreviations being:

On some keyboards, the c-cedilla key (Ç) is located one or two lines above, rather than on the right of, the acute accent key (´). In some cases it is placed on the right of the plus sign key (+), while in other keyboards it is situated on the right of the inverted exclamation mark key (¡).

Latin America, officially known as Spanish Latinamerican sort

The Latin American Spanish keyboard layout is used throughout Mexico, Central and South America. Before its design, Latin American vendors had been selling the Spanish (Spain) layout as default.

Its most obvious difference from the Spanish (Spain) layout is the lack of a Ç key; on Microsoft Windows it lacks a tilde (~) dead key, whereas on Linux systems the dead tilde can be optionally enabled. This is not a problem when typing in Spanish, but it is rather problematic when typing in Portuguese, which can be an issue in countries with large commercial ties to Brazil (Argentina, Uruguay and Paraguay).

Normally "Bloq Mayús" is used instead of "Caps Lock", and "Intro" instead of "Enter".

Swedish

The central characteristics of the Swedish keyboard are the three additional letters Å/å, Ä/ä, and Ö/ö. The same visual layout is also in use in Finland and Estonia, as the letters Ä/ä and Ö/ö are shared with the Swedish language, and even Å/å is needed by Swedish-speaking Finns. However, the Finnish multilingual keyboard adds new letters and punctuation to the functional layout.

The Swedish with Sámi keyboard allows typing not only Ø/ø and Æ/æ, but even the letters required to write various Sámi languages. This keyboard has the same function for all the keys engraved on the regular Swedish keyboard, and the additional letters are available through the  key.

(on the upper row) produces the ° sign, and  produces the € sign.

On Linux systems, the Swedish keyboard may also give access to additional characters as follows:
 first row:  ¶¡@£$€¥{[]}\± and  ¾¹²³¼¢⅝÷«»°¿¬
 second row:  @ł€®þ←↓→œþ"~ and  ΩŁ¢®Þ¥↑ıŒÞ°ˇ
 third row:  ªßðđŋħjĸłøæ´ and  º§ÐªŊĦJ&ŁØÆ×
 fourth row:  |«»©""nµ¸·̣  and  ¦<>©‘’Nº˛˙˙
Several of these characters function as dead keys.

Turkish

As of 2022, the majority of Turkish keyboards are based on QWERTY (the so-called Q-keyboard layout), although there is also the older F-keyboard layout specifically designed for the language.

Vietnamese

The Vietnamese keyboard layout is an extended Latin QWERTY layout. The letters Ă, Â, Ê, and Ô are found on what would be the number keys – on the US English keyboard, with – producing the tonal marks (grave accent, hook, tilde, acute accent and dot below, in that order),  producing Đ,  producing the đồng sign (₫) when not shifted, and brackets producing Ư and Ơ.

Multilingual variants
Multilingual keyboard layouts, unlike the default layouts supplied for one language and market, try to make it possible for the user to type in any of several languages using the same number of keys.

This section also tries to arrange the layouts in ascending order by the number of possible languages and not chronologically according to the Latin alphabet as usual.

Canadian Multilingual Standard

The Canadian Multilingual Standard keyboard layout is used by some Canadians, mostly in Quebec and New-Brunswick. Though the caret (^) is missing, it is easily inserted by typing the circumflex accent followed by a space. This layout use three levels and two groups, up to 5 characters per key. Alt-Gr key is used to type a character on the level 3  and the Group 2 has a dedicated key  instead of the Right-Ctrl .

United Kingdom (Extended) Layout

Windows
From Windows XP SP2 onwards, Microsoft has included a variant of the British QWERTY keyboard (the "United Kingdom Extended" keyboard layout) that can additionally generate several diacritical marks. This supports input on a standard physical UK keyboard for many languages without changing positions of frequently used keys, which is useful when working with text in Welsh, Scottish Gaelic and Irish — languages native to parts of the UK (Wales, parts of Scotland and Northern Ireland respectively).

In this layout, the grave accent key becomes, as it also does in the US International layout, a dead key modifying the character generated by the next key pressed. Additional precomposed characters are also obtained by shifting the 'normal' key using the  key. The extended keyboard is software installed from the Windows control panel, and the extended characters are not normally engraved on keyboards.

The UK Extended keyboard uses mostly the AltGr key to add diacritics to the letters a, e, i, n, o, u, w and y (the last two being used in Welsh) as appropriate for each character, as well as to their capitals. Pressing the key and then a character that does not take the specific diacritic produces the behaviour of a standard keyboard. The key presses followed by spacebar generate a stand-alone mark.:

 grave accents (e.g. à, è, etc.) needed for Scots Gaelic are generated by pressing the grave accent (or 'backtick') key , which is a dead key, then the letter. Thus  produces à.
 acute accents (e.g. á) needed for Irish are generated by pressing the  key together with the letter (or  acting as a dead key combination followed by the letter). Thus  produces á;  produces Á.
Thus  then  produces â,  then   produces the letter ŵ.

Some other languages commonly studied in the UK and Ireland are also supported to some extent:
 diaeresis or umlaut (e.g. ä, ë, ö, etc.) is generated by a dead key combination , then the letter. Thus  produces ä.
 tilde (e.g. ã, ñ, õ, etc., as used in Spanish and Portuguese) is generated by dead key combination , then the letter. Thus  produces ã.

The  and letter method used for acutes and cedillas does not work for applications which assign shortcut menu functions to these key combinations.

The UK Extended layout is almost entirely transparent to users familiar with the UK layout. A machine with the extended layout behaves exactly as with the standard UK, except for the rarely used grave accent key. This makes this layout suitable for a machine for shared or public use by a user population in which some use the extended functions.

Despite being created for multilingual users, UK-Extended in Windows does have some gaps — there are many languages that it cannot cope with, including Romanian and Turkish, and all languages with different character sets, such as Greek and Russian. It also does not cater for thorn (þ, Þ) in Old English, the ß in German, the œ in French, nor for the å, æ, ø, ð, þ in Nordic languages.

ChromeOS

The UK Extended layout in ChromeOS provides all the same combinations as with Windows, but adds many more symbols and dead keys via AltGr.

Notes: Dotted circle (◌) is used here to indicate a dead key. The  key is the only one that acts as a free-standing dead key and thus does not respond as shown on the key-cap. All others are invoked by AltGr. 
 (°) is a degree sign;   (º) is a masculine ordinal indicator
Dead keys
  produces grave accents (e.g.) ( produces a standalone grave sign).
 (release) produces diaeresis accents (e.g.)
(release) produces circumflex accents (e.g.)
  (release)  produces (mainly) comma diacritic or cedilla below the letter e.g., 
  (release)  produces a hook (diacritic) on vowels (e.g.)
AltGr+[ same as AltGr+2
AltGr+] same as AltGr+# 
(release) produces overrings  (e.g.) 
(release) produces macrons  (e.g.) 
(release) produces mainly horn (diacritic)s  (e.g.)
(release) produces an adjacent horn (e.g.)
(release) produces acute accents (e.g.) 
(release) produces double acute accents on some letters (e.g.) that exist in Unicode as pre-composed characters
 (release) produces acute accents (e.g.)
 (release) produces caron (haček)  diacritics (e.g.) 
 (release) produces tilde diacritics (e.g.)
 (release) produces inverted breve  diacritics (e.g.) 
(release) produces mainly underdots  (e.g.) 
(release) produces mainly overdots  (e.g.)

For example  (release)  produces the Ethiopic syllable SEE, ሴ.

US-International

Windows and Linux

An alternative layout uses the physical US keyboard to type diacritics in some operating systems (including Windows). This is the US-International layout setting, which uses the right  key as an  key to support many additional characters directly as an additional shift key. The international keyboard is a software setting installed from the Windows control panel or similar;  the additional functions (shown in blue) may or may not be engraved on the keyboard, but are always functional. It can be used to type most major languages from Western Europe: Afrikaans, Danish, Dutch, English, Faroese, Finnish, French, German, Icelandic, Irish, Italian, Norwegian, Portuguese, Scottish Gaelic, Spanish, and Swedish. Some less common western and central European languages (such as Welsh, Maltese, Czech and Hungarian), are not fully supported by the US-International keyboard layout because of their use of additional diacritics or precomposed characters.

A diacritic key is activated by pressing and releasing it, then pressing the letter that requires the diacritic. After the two strokes, the single character with diacritics is generated. Note that only certain letters, such as vowels and "n", can have diacritics in this way. To generate the symbols ', `, ", ^ and ~, when the following character is capable of having a diacritic, press the  after the key.

Characters with diacritics can be typed with the following combinations:
  + vowel → vowel with acute accent, e.g.,  → é
  + vowel → vowel with grave accent, e.g.,  → è
  + vowel → vowel with diaeresis (or umlaut), e.g.,  → ë
  + vowel → vowel with circumflex accent, e.g.,  → ê
  + ,  or  → letter with tilde, e.g.  → ñ,  → õ
  +  → ç (Windows) or ć (X11)

The US-International layout is not entirely transparent to users familiar with the conventional US layout; when using a machine with the international layout setting active, the commonly used single- and double-quote keys and the less commonly used grave accent, tilde, and circumflex (caret) keys are dead keys and thus behave unconventionally. This could be disconcerting on a machine for shared or public use.

There are also alternative US-International mappings, whereby modifier keys such as shift and alt are used, and the keys for the characters with diacritics are in different places from their unmodified counterparts.  For example, the right-Alt key may be remapped as an AltGr modifier key or as a compose key and the dead key function deactivated, so that they (the ASCII quotation marks and circumflex symbol) can be typed normally with a single keystroke.

US-International in the Netherlands
The standard keyboard layout in the Netherlands is US-International, as it provides easy access to diacritics on common UK- or US-like keyboards. The Dutch layout is historical, and keyboards with this layout are rarely used. Many US keyboards sold do not have the extra US-International characters or  engraved on the keys, although € always is; nevertheless, the keys work as expected even if not marked. Many computer-literate Dutch people have retained the old habit of using  + number codes to type accented characters; others routinely type without diacritics, then use a spelling checker to produce the correct forms.

Apple International English Keyboard

There are three kinds of Apple Keyboards for English: the United States, the United Kingdom and International English.

Differences from the US layout are:

 The  key is located on the left of the  key, and the  key is located on the right of the  key.
 The  key is added on the left of the  key.
 The left  key is shortened and the  key has the shape of inverted L.

Finnish multilingual

The visual layout used in Finland is basically the same as the Swedish layout. This is practical, as Finnish and Swedish share the special characters Ä/ä and Ö/ö, and while the Swedish Å/å is unnecessary for writing Finnish, it is needed by Swedish-speaking Finns and to write Swedish family names which are common.

As of 2008, there is a new standard for the Finnish multilingual keyboard layout, developed as part of a localization project by CSC. All the engravings of the traditional Finnish–Swedish visual layout have been retained, so there is no need to change the hardware, but the functionality has been extended considerably, as additional characters (e.g., Æ/æ, Ə/ə, Ʒ/ʒ) are available through the  key, as well as dead keys, which allow typing a wide variety of letters with diacritics (e.g., Ç/ç, Ǥ/ǥ, Ǯ/ǯ).

Based on the Latin letter repertory included in the Multilingual European Subset No. 2 (MES-2) of the Unicode standard, the layout has three main objectives. First, it provides for easy entering of text in both Finnish and Swedish, the two official languages of Finland, using the familiar keyboard layout but adding some advanced punctuation options, such as dashes, typographical quotation marks, and the non-breaking space (NBSP).

Second, it is designed to offer an indirect but intuitive way to enter the special letters and diacritics needed by the other three Nordic national languages (Danish, Norwegian and Icelandic) as well as the regional and minority languages (Northern Sámi, Southern Sámi, Lule Sámi, Inari Sámi, Skolt Sámi, Romani language as spoken in Finland, Faroese, Kalaallisut also known as Greenlandic, and German).

As a third objective, it allows for relatively easy entering of particularly names (of persons, places or products) in a variety of European languages using a more or less extended Latin alphabet, such as the official languages of the European Union (excluding Bulgarian and Greek). Some letters, like Ł/ł needed for Slavic languages, are accessed by a special "overstrike" key combination acting like a dead key. 
However, the Romanian letters Ș/ș and Ț/ț (S/s and T/t with comma below) are not supported; the presumption is that Ş/ş and Ţ/ţ (with cedilla) suffice as surrogates.

EurKEY

EurKEY, a multilingual keyboard layout which is intended for Europeans, programmers and translators uses true QWERTY (US layout) as base just adding a third and fourth layer available through the  key and +. These additional layers allows the users to type the symbolism of many European languages, special characters, the Greek alphabet (via dead keys), and many common mathematical symbols.

Unlike most of the other QWERTY layouts which are standards for a country or region, EurKEY is not a standard of the European Union, yet that is why a petition of EurKEY as European standard was started.

To address the ergonomics issue of QWERTY, EurKEY Colemak-DH was also developed a Colmak-DH version with the EurKEY design principals.

See also
Dvorak Simplified Keyboard, designed for Brazilian Portuguese

References

Informational notes

Citations

Latin-script keyboard layouts
Computing-related lists